A Viereckschanze (from German "four-corner-rampart"; plural -en) is a rectangular ditched enclosure that was constructed during the Iron Age in parts of Celtic Western Europe. They are widespread in Germany, parts of northern France and also in some regions of the Iberian Peninsula, most notably in Portugal.

See also
 Nemeton

References

Celtic archaeology
European archaeology
Fortifications by type
Iron Age Europe
German words and phrases